Lantana montevidensis is a species of lantana known by many common names, such as: trailing lantana, weeping lantana, creeping lantana, small lantana, purple lantana or trailing shrubverbena.

This lantana  is native to South America.

Description

Lantana montevidensis is a small strongly scented flowering low shrub with oval-shaped green leaves. With support it has a climbing 'vine' form, when on edge a trailing form, and on the flat a groundcover form.

The inflorescence is a circular head of several purple to lavender to white funnel-shaped flowers with lobed corollas each nearly a centimeter wide. Yellow-flowered montevidensis are a case of misidentification and most often relate to the "New Gold" lantana Lantana × hybrida, a hybrid between camara and montevidensis. Occasionally these yellow-flowered plants are misidentified Lantana depressa var. depressa, a Florida endemic taxon more closely related to Lantana camara with smaller, less robust flowers.

The fruit consists of a pair of nutlets surrounded by flesh somewhat like a berry.

Cultivation
Lantana montevidensis  is also cultivated as an ornamental plant for its plentiful colorful lavender to purple flowers and as a drought tolerant groundcover, woody vine,  and trailing plant for containers and in the ground.

In temperate climates there are flowers most of the year, with yellow blooming and variegated leaved cultivars also available.

Invasive species
The plant is present nearly worldwide as an introduced species of garden and landscape plant, and in some areas, such as parts of Australia and Hawaii, now a noxious weed and invasive species. This plant is toxic to livestock.

Etymology
The name Lantana derives from the Latin name of the wayfaring tree Viburnum lantana, the flowers of which closely resemble Lantana.

References

External links

Jepson Manual Treatment
Weed Status
New Gold Lantana

montevidensis
Flora of northern South America
Flora of southern South America
Flora of western South America
Garden plants of South America
Drought-tolerant plants
Vines
Groundcovers